David Backhouse (born 23 October 1981) is a Dutch slalom canoeist who competed from the late 1990s to the late 2000s. He won a silver medal in the K-1 team event at the 2003 ICF Canoe Slalom World Championships in Augsburg.

References

Profile

1981 births
Living people
Dutch male canoeists
Sportspeople from Helmond
Medalists at the ICF Canoe Slalom World Championships